The men's 500 meter at the 2022 KNSB Dutch Single Distance Championships took place in Heerenveen at the Thialf ice skating rink on Friday 29 October 2021. Although the tournament was held in 2021 it was the 2022 edition as it was part of the 2021–2022 speed skating season. There were 24 participants who raced twice over 500m so that all skaters had to start once in the inner lane and once in the outer lane. The first 4 skaters plus Merijn Scheperkamp were eligible for the following World Cup tournaments.

Statistics

Result

Draw 1st. 500 meter

Draw 2nd. 500 meter

Referee: Bert Timmermans.  Assistant: Wil Schildwacht.  Starter: André de Vries 

Source:

References

Single Distance Championships
2022 Single Distance